Allittia is a genus of flowering plants belonging to the family Asteraceae.

Its native range is Southeastern Australia, namely New South Wales, Victoria, Tasmania and South Australia.

Species:

Allittia cardiocarpa 
Allittia uliginosa

References

Asteraceae
Asteraceae genera